This is a list of internal combustion engines models manufactured by the Honda Motor Company.

Automotive

Inline 2-cylinder 
 EH：1977–1988 Acty:1985–1988 Today

Inline 3-cylinder 
 E07A-series
 00–06 ECA1 (hybrid)
 88–98 E05A
 E07A
 E07Z
 2012+ S07A
 2012+ S07A turbo
 P-series
 2003–2011 P07A
 P07A turbo
 2016 P10A turbo

Inline 4-cylinder 
The number in the engine code gives the approximate displacement of the engine. e.g. B18A would have an approximate displacement of 1.8L, H22A1 would have an approximate displacement of 2.2L.

Some engines below were available in more than one market.

 A-series
84–87 A18A1 Prelude (America)
85–89 A20 Accord carbureted (Europe, America)
86+ A20A1 Accord 2.0 carbureted - EX (Canada), DX LX (US)
86+ A20A2 Accord 2.0 carbureted - EX (Europe)
88–89 A20A3 Accord 2.0 EFI - LX-i SE-i (America)
86+ A20A4 Accord 2.0 EFI - EXi (Europe)
 B-series
89–92 B16A Civic - SiR (Japan)
90–93 B16A Integra - RSi/XSi (Japan)
92–95 B16A Civic - SiR II (Japan)
89–92 B16A1 Civic - VT (Europe)
90–91 B16A1 Civic - SiR (Japan)
91–95 B16A2 Civic - Vti (Europe)
99–00 B16A2 Civic - Si (America)
94–97 B16A3 del Sol VTEC (America)
94–97 B16A3 del Sol - Vti-T (Europe)

96–00 B16A4 Civic - SiR II (Japan)
96–00 B16A6 Ballade - VTEC (SO3/SO4) (South Africa)
97–01 B16B Civic Type-R (Japan)
92–93 B17A1 Integra GS-R (America)
90–93 B18A1 Integra (America)
94–01 B18B1 Integra (America)
94–96 B18B3 Ballade Ballade = 4dr Civic (South Africa)
96–00 B18B4 Ballade Ballade = 4dr Civic (South Africa)
94–95 B18C Integra Si VTEC (Japan)
95–99 B18C Integra SiR-G (Japan)
96–00 B18C Integra Type R (Japan)
94–01 B18C1 Integra GS-R (America)
96–97 B18C3 Integra Type R (Taiwan/Hong Kong)
96 B18C3 Civic VTi 1.8
97+ B18C4 Civic 1.8 Vti (Europe)
97; 98; 00–01 B18C5 Integra Type R (America)
96+ B18C6 Integra Type R (Europe)
96+ B18C7 Integra Type R (Australia)
87–89 B20 Accord 2.0i (Europe)
85–87 B20A1 Prelude Fi (Europe)
86+ B20A1 Prelude 2.0i (Europe)
87+ B20A2 Accord 2.0i EX (Europe)
90-91 B20A3 Prelude 2.0 S (America)
88+ B20A4 Prelude 2.0
90–91 B20A5 Prelude 2.0 Si (America)
88–89 B20A5 Prelude Si (America)
88–91 B20A6 Prelude 4WS Si (Australia)
87–92 B20A7 Prelude 2.0i (Europe)
88+ B20A8 Accord 2.0i (Europe)
87–92 B20A9 Prelude 4WS 2.0i (Europe)
97–98 B20B CR-V (America)
97+ B20B3 CR-V RD1 (Europe)
97–98 B20B4 CR-V
B20Z SMX (Japan)
90–91 B21A1 Prelude Si (America)
 D-series
 1991 1.4 L D14 (Civic)
 84–87 1.5 L D15A2 (CRX) HF
 85–87 1.5 L D15A3 (CRX) Si
 91–99 1.5 L D15B (Civic)  VTi VTEC
 96–02 1.3 L D13B4 (City)LXi/EXi/DX
 88–91 1.5 L D15B2 (Civic) DX/LX, (CRX) DX (LSi in Europe)
 88–91 1.5 L D15B6 (Civic) Base, (CRX) HF
 92–95 1.5 L D15B7 (Civic) DX/LX, Del Sol S
 92–95 1.5 L D15B8 (Civic) CX
99–02 1.5 L D15C2 Honda City VTEC - (India)
 92–95 1.5 L D15Z1 (Civic) VX VTEC-E
 96–98 1.5 L D15Z4 (Civic) LX
 96–00 1.5 L D15Z6 (Civic) (VTEC SOHC) (iLS in Europe)
 86–89 1.6 L D16A1 (Integra) DOHC
 86–89 1.6 L D16A3 (Integra) DOHC (Australia)
 88–91 1.6 L D16A6 (Civic) Si, (CRX) Si, (Civic) EX (South Africa)
 88–89 1.6 L D16A8 (Integra) DOHC
 88–89 1.6 L D16A9 (Integra) (CRX in Europe) DOHC (South Africa)
 92–95 1.6 L D16Y1 (Civic) Vti SOHC (Australia)
 96–00 1.6 L D16Y4 (Civic) İES NON VTEC(TURKEY)
 96–00 1.6 L D16Y5 (Civic) HX VTEC-E
 97–00 1.6 L D16Y7 (Civic) DX/LX/CX
 96–00 1.6 L D16Y8 (Civic) EX/(Canada)Si VTEC
 90–92 1.6 L D16Z5 (Civic) (CRX in Europe) DOHC
 92–95 1.6 L D16Z6 (Civic) EX/Si, Del Sol Si VTEC
 01–05 1.7 L D17A1 (Civic) DX/LX
VTEC
 D-series
 01–05 1.7 L D17A2 (Civic) EX VTEC/VTEC-II
 01–05 1.7 L D17A6 (Civic) HX VTEC-E
 04–05 1.7 L D17A7 (Civic) GX
 98–06 1.6 L D16A (HR-V) J/J4
 98–06 1.6 L D16A (HR-V) JS/JS4 VTEC
 96–00 1.6 L D16Y8 (Civic) EX/(Canada)Si VTEC
92–95 1.6 L D16Z6 (Civic) EX/Si, Del Sol Si VTEC
 E-series
 1973 1.2 L EB (Civic)
 1975 1.5 L EC (Civic) 
 1975 1.5 L ED (Civic) CVCC
 1976 1.6 L EF (Accord)
 1980 1.3 L EJ (Civic)
 1979 1.8 L EK (Accord/Prelude)
 1979 1.6 L EL (Accord/Prelude)
 1980 1.5 L EM (Civic) CVCC
 1980 1.3 L EN (Civic)
 1980 1.6 L EP (Quint/Accord)
 1981 1.2 L ER (City AA)
 1983 1.8 L ES (Accord/Prelude)
 1983 1.8 L ET (Prelude)
 1983 1.3 L EV (Civic)
 1983 1.5 L EW (Civic/CRX)
 1983 1.5 L EW2 (Civic)
 1985 1.5 L EW3 (Civic/CRX)
 1984 1.4-1.5 L EW4 (Civic)
 F-series
 94–02 1.8 L Honda F engine#F18B (Accord) VTEC
 1988 2.0 L F20 (Accord) VTEC
 92–97 F20A4 (Prelude) SOHC
 00–05 F20C (S2000) (Japan)
 00–03 F20C1 (S2000) (America)
 05–09 F22C (S2000) (Japan)
 04–09 F22C1 (S2000) (America)
 90–96 F22 (Accord/Prelude/CL/Odyssey/Isusu Oasis/Isuzu Aska) VTEC & Non-VTEC
 98–02 2.3 L F23 (Accord/CL/Odyssey/Isuzu Oasis) VTEC
 H-series
92–96 H22A Prelude Si VTEC (Japan)
94–97 H22A Accord SiR (Japan)
97–01 H22A Prelude SiR, SiR S-spec, Type S (Japan)
00–02 H22A Accord Euro R (Europe)
93–96 H22A1 Prelude VTEC (America)
93–96 H20A4 Modified Prelude VTEC (America)
97–98 H22A1 Prelude VTiR (Australia)
93–96 H22A2 Prelude 2.2i VTEC (Europe)
1996 H22A3 Prelude VTEC (KU)
97–01 H22A4 Prelude SH & Base(America)
97–98 H22A5 Modified Prelude (Europe)
99–02 H22A7 Accord Type R (Europe)
99–01 H22A8 Modified Prelude (Europe)
99–01 H22Z1 Prelude VTiR (Australia)
99–02 H23A Accord Wagon, SiR Wagon (Japan)
91–93 H23A1 Prelude SRS (Australia)
91–95 H23A1 Prelude Si (Australia)
92–96 H23A1 Prelude Si; SE (America)
92–96 H23A2 Prelude 2.3i (Europe)
93–95 H23A3 Accord 2.3i SR (Europe)
 L-series
 2001 1.3 L L13A (Fit/Jazz) - engine marketed as 1.4L in certain regions
 2002 1.2 L L12A (Jazz)
 2002 1.5 L L15A (Fit/Fit Aria/Airwave/Mobilio)
 2013 1.5 L L15B DOHC (Fit)
 2016 1.5 L L15B DOHC VTC Turbo (Honda Civic/Honda Accord/Honda HR-V/Honda CR-V)
 2012 1.5 L LEA-MF6 (Honda Civic Hybrid)
 Circle L - General Motors/Isuzu 1.7 L Diesel
 R-series
 2006 1.6 L R16A (Honda Civic) i-VTEC (Singapore, Egypt, Turkey, Cyprus)
 2006 1.8 L R18A1 (Honda Civic) i-VTEC
 2006 1.8 L R18A2 (Honda Civic) i-VTEC (EDM)
 2006 2.0 L R20A1 (Honda Stream) i-VTEC
 2013 2.0 L R20A1 (Acura ILX) i-VTEC
i-VTEC
 K-series
01–11 K20A Integra TYPE-R; Civic TYPE-R; Accord Euro R (Japan)
02–04 K20A2 RSX Type S (America)
01+ K20A3 Integra IS (Japan)
01–06 K20A3 RSX Base, Civic Si (America)
03+ K20B 2.0l VTEC-i, Stream 4WD (Japan)
03+ K24A Accord; Accord Wagon (Japan)
03–08 K24A2 TSX 200 (America)
(03+) 02+ K24A3 CRV; Element; Accord
(03–05) K24A4 2.4L VTEC-i Honda Accord
(06–07) K24A8 2.4L VTEC-i (Drive-by wire equipped) Accord
(08–Present) K24Z3 2.4L Honda Accord / Accord Euro (CU2)
05–06 K20Z1 RSX Type S (America)
(07+) K23A1 RDX
(06–11) K20Z3 Civic Si
(07–11) K20Z4 Civic Type-R (Europe)
12+ K24Z7 Civic Si
13+ K24W2 Accord
13+ K24W3 Accord Sport
15+ K20C1 Civic Type-R
Diesel
 N-series
 201?–Present 1.6 L N16A1
 04–06 2.2 L N22A2 FR-V (Europe)/Edix (Japan) - diesel i-CTDi (Common Rail Direct Fuel Injection)

Inline 5-cylinder 
G-series
 1993–1997 2.0 L G20 (Ascot/Rafaga)
 1989–1994 2.0 L G20 (Honda Inspire)
 1992–1994 2.5 L G25 (Vigor)
 1995–1998 2.5 L G25 (TL)

V6 
RA16 - 80° DOHC
 1983–1984 1.5 L RA163E (Spirit 201/Williams FW09)
 1985 1.5 L RA165E (Williams FW10)
 1986 1.5 L RA166E (Williams FW11/Lotus 99T)
 1987 1.5 L RA167E (Williams FW11B)
 1988 1.5 L RA168E (McLaren MP4/4/Lotus 100T)
 C-series - 90° SOHC
 1986–1987 2.5 L C25 (Legend/Rover 825/Sterling 825L/Sterling SL)
 1986–1997 2.7 L C27 (Legend/Accord/Rover 827/Sterling 827L/Sterling SL/Rover Vitesse/Rover Coupe)
 1991–1995 3.2 L C32 (Legend)
 1996–2004 3.5 L C35 (RL/Legend)
 C-series - 90° DOHC
 1991–2005 3.0 L C30A - NSX (manual transmission to 1996, all automatic transmission)
 1997–2005 3.2 L C32B - NSX (manual transmission from 1997)
 J-series - 60° SOHC
 1998–2003 2.5 L J25A 
 1998–2003 J25A - Inspire, Saber
 1997+ 3.0 L J30A
 1997–2003 J30A1 - Odyssey, CL, Avancier, Accord
 2003–2005 J30A4 - Accord
 2003–2007 J30A5 - Accord, Inspire
 2020 J30T turbo - Acura TLX Type-S
 2013+ J30Y1 - RDX (China)
 2005–2007 JNA1 - Accord Hybrid
 2017+  JNA2 - Acura MDX Sport Hybrid
 1998–2008 3.2 L J32A
 1998–2003 J32A1 - CL, TL, Inspire
 2001–2003 J32A2 - CL Type-S, TL Type-S
 2004–2008 J32A3 - TL
 1998+ 3.5 L J35A 
 1999–2001 J35A1 - Odyssey
 2002–2004 J35A3 - MDX, Vue (also referred to as GM L66)
 2002–2004 J35A4 - Odyssey, Pilot
 2005+ J35A6 - Odyssey, Pilot
 2005+ J35A7 - Odyssey, Inspire
 2005–2008 J35A8 - RL, TL Type-S
 2006–2008 J35A9 - Ridgeline, Pilot (4WD)
 2008–2017 3.5 L J35Z 
 2006–2008 J35Z1 - Pilot (front-drive)
 2008–2012 J35Z2 - Honda Accord
 2008–2012 J35Z3 - Honda Accord (manual transmission)
 2009–2014 J35Z4 - Honda Pilot
 2009–2014 J35Z5 - Ridgeline
 2009–2014 J35Z6 - TSX V6, TL (front-drive)
 2011–2017 J35Z8 - Odyssey
 2013+ 3.5 L Earth Dreams J-series
 2013+ J35Y1 - Accord
 2013+ J35Y2 - Accord
 2014+ J35Y4 - RLX
 2014+ J35Y5 - MDX
 2015+ J35Y6 - TLX, Ridgeline (2017+)
 2007–2014 3.7 L J37 
 2007–2013 J37A1 - MDX
 2009–2012 J37A2 - RL
 2007–2014 J37A4 - TL (AWD)
 2010–2013 J37A5 - ZDX
 Earth Dreams J-series - 75° DOHC
 2015+ 3.5 L JNC1 (EarthDreams) 
 Earth Dreams J-series - 65° DOHC
 2021+ 3.0 L J30AC (EarthDreams)
 2021+ ? - TLX Type-S
 2021+ ? - MDX Type-S
 HI14RTT
 2012+ 2.2 L twin-turbo (Dallara DW12)
 HR28TT
 2010 2.8 L twin-turbo (Acura ARX-01)
 2012 2.8 L twin-turbo (HPD ARX-03 and Ligier JS P2)
 2014 2.8 L twin-turbo (HPD ARX-04b)
 HR35TT/AR35TT
 2015 3.5 L twin-turbo (SCG 003 Competizione)
 2016 3.5 L twin-turbo (Ligier JS P2)
 2018 3.5 L twin-turbo (Acura ARX-05)
 Honda Formula 1 V6 turbo hybrid - 90° DOHC
2015 1.6 L RA615H (McLaren MP4-30)
2016 1.6 L RA616H (McLaren MP4-31)
2017 1.6 L RA617H (McLaren MCL32)
2018 1.6 L RA618H (Toro Rosso STR13)
2019 1.6 L RA619H (Red Bull RB15 and Toro Rosso STR14)
2020 1.6 L RA620H (Red Bull RB16 and AlphaTauri AT01)
2021 1.6 L RA621H (Red Bull RB16B and AlphaTauri AT02)

V8 
 Honda turbocharged Indy V8 - 90° DOHC
 1986–2002 2.65 L
 HIR Indy V8 series - 90° DOHC
 2003 3.5 L HI3R (Dallara IR-03)
 2004 3.5 L HI4R (Dallara IR-03)
 2004 3.0 L HI4R-A (Dallara IR-03)
 2005 3.0 L HI5R (Dallara IR-03)
 2006 3.0 L HI6R (Dallara IR-03)
 2007 3.5 L HI7R (Dallara IR-05)
 2008 3.5 L HI8R (Dallara IR-05)
 2009 3.5 L HI9R (Dallara IR-05)
 2010 3.5 L HI10R (Dallara IR-05)
 2011 3.5 L HI11R (Dallara IR-05)
 Honda Formula 1 V8 - 90° DOHC
 1968 3.0 L RA302E
 2006 2.4 L RA806E
 2007 2.4 L RA807E
 2008 2.4 L RA808E
 LM-AR6
 2007 3.4 L (Acura ARX-01)
 2012 3.4 L (HPD ARX-03)
 LM-AR7
 2009 4.0 L (Acura ARX-02)
 Honda HR-09E/HR-10EG - 90° DOHC
 2009–2013 3.4 L HR-09E (Swift 017.n) 
 2010–2013 3.4 L HR-10EG (Honda HSV-010 GT)

V10
 Honda Formula 1 V10 - 72°-90° DOHC
1989 3.5 L RA109E (McLaren MP4/5)
1990 3.5 L RA100E (McLaren MP4/5B)
2000 3.0 L RA000E (BAR 002)
2001 3.0 L RA001E (BAR 003 and Jordan EJ11)
2002 3.0 L RA002E (BAR 004 and Jordan EJ12)
2003 3.0 L RA003E (BAR 005)
2004 3.0 L RA004E (BAR 006)
2005 3.0 L RA005E (BAR 007)

V12
 Honda Formula 1 V12 - 60°-75° DOHC
1964 1.5 L RA271E 
1965 1.5 L RA272E
1966/1967 3.0 L RA273E
1967/1968 3.0 L RA273E 
1968 3.0 L RA273E
1991 3.5 L RA121E
1992 3.5 L RA122E/B

Motorcycle, ATV and watercraft

1-cylinder

2-cylinder 
Honda MC51E (CBR250RR)
Production 2017–Present
Engine 249 cm3 liquid-cooled, DOHC 8-valve (4 valve per-cylinder), Inline-Twin Cylinder, 4 Stroke.
Bore x Stroke 62.0×41.3 mm
Compression Ratio 11.5 : 1
Induction type Programmed Fuel-Injection (PGM-Fi)
Power 38.7 PS @ 12.500 rpm
Features : Throttle by Wire, Riding Mode., Starter Electric Only
Honda CX500
 Engine Type 498cc liquid-cooled two-cylinder "Flying V-Twin" four-stroke
 Bore and Stroke 78.0 mm x 52.0 mm
 Compression Ratio 10.0:1
 Valve Train OHV Cam-in-block; four-valve-per-cylinder
 Carburetion Twin Keihin 40.0 mm butterfly with manual choke
 Ignition Triple-wound stator, low speed, high speed, and charging, transistor ignition
 Starter Electric only
Honda CB500
 Engine Type 499cc liquid-cooled two-cylinder "Parallel-twin" four-stroke
 Bore & Stroke 73 mm × 59.5 mm
 Compression Ratio 10.5:1
 Valve Train DOHC chain-driven four-valve-per-cylinder
 Carburetion Two 34mm Keihin flat-slide VPs carburetors with manual choke
 Ignition Dual-coil CDI
 Starter Electric only

V4-cylinder 

Honda VFR800(A) (RC46) (2002–2009)
Engine Type 781cc liquid-cooled four-stroke 90-degree DOHC V4
Bore and Stroke 72 mm x 48 mm
Compression Ratio 11.6:1
Valve Train VTEC chain-driven DOHC, 4 valves per cylinder
 earlier versions were non-VTEC, gear driven DOHC, 4 valves /cylinder
Pre-cat converter delivered 110 BHP
Fuel Delivery PGM-FI fuel injection
Starter Electric only

6-cylinder 
The Honda CBX motorcycle (1978–1982) contains a 1047cc inline-6-cylinder engine. The engine used a DOHC 24-valve cam-over-bucket valvetrain to support high RPMs.

Power equipment

General-purpose engines
Current Honda general-purpose engines are air-cooled 4-stroke gasoline engines but 2-stroke, Diesel, water-cooled engines were also manufactured in the past.
The current engine range provide from 1 to 22 hp (0.7 to 16.5 kW).

More than 5 million general-purpose engines were manufactured by Honda in 2009.
Approximately 70% of the general-purpose engines manufactured by Honda are supplied as OEM engines to other manufacturers of power products.

Current range (US & Europe)

1-cylinder

GX series
Horizontal shaft
GX100 (OHC) (2002–) (98cc)
GX120 (OHV) (1991–) (118cc)
GXR120 (OHV) (2013–) (121cc)
GX160 (OHV) (1991–) (163cc)
GX200 (OHV) (1995–) (196cc)
GX240 (OHV) (1986–) (270cc)
GX270 (OHV) (1991–) (270cc)
GX340 (OHV) (1986–) (389cc)
GX390 (OHV) (1991–) (389cc)
Vertical shaft
GXV160 (OHV) (1987–) (163cc)
GXV340 (OHV) (1986–) (337cc)
GXV390 (OHV) (1990–) (389cc)
iGX series
Horizontal shaft
iGX240 (OHV) (2010–)
iGX270 (OHV) (2010–)
iGX340 (OHV) (2010–) (388cc)
iGX390 (OHV) (2010–) (389cc)
iGX440 (OHC) (2005–) (438cc)
GC/GS series (OHC)
Horizontal shaft
GC160 (1997–) (160cc)
GC190 (2003–) (187cc)
GS190 (2004–) (187cc)
Vertical shaft
GCV160 (1997–) (160cc)
GCV190 (2003–) (187cc)
GSV190 (2004–) (187cc)
GP series (OHV) (European market)
Horizontal shaft
GP160 (?–) (163cc)
GP200 (?–) (196cc)
Mini 4-stroke series
Horizontal shaft
GX25 (OHC) (2002–) (25cc)
GX35 (OHC) (2005–) (35cc)
GXH50 (OHV) (1999–) (49cc)
Vertical shaft
GXV50 (OHV) (1999–) (49cc)
GXV57 (OHV) (?–) (57cc) (European market)

2-cylinder (V-Twin)

GX series
Horizontal shaft
GX630 (OHV) (2009–) (688cc)
GX660 (OHV) (2009–) (688cc)
GX690 (OHV) (2009–) (688cc)
Vertical shaft
GXV530 (OHC) (2003–) (530cc)
GXV630 (OHV) (2009–) (688cc)
GXV660 (OHV) (2009–) (688cc)
GXV690 (OHV) (2009–) (688cc)
GC series (OHC)
Vertical shaft
GCV520 (2003–) (530cc)
GCV530 (2003–) (530cc)
HD series (diesel)
HD6500 (G390) (2004–)
HD7500 (G395) (2004–)

Past models

Early models (all 1-cylinder, air-cooled)
type-H (1953–?) (2-st., 50cc)
type-T (1954–?) (4-st., side-valve, 130cc)
type-VN (1956–?) (4-st., side-valve, 172cc)
T10 (1962–?) (4-st., side-valve, 19.7cc) (training purpose only, not marketed)
G20 (1963–?) (4-st., side-valve, 132cc)
G25 (1966–1969) (4-st., OHC, 59cc)
G28 (1969–1977) (4-st., OHC, 67cc)
G35 (1976–1980) (4-st., side-valve, 144cc)
GV35 (1976–1979)
G40 (?–1969) (4-st., side-valve, 170cc)
G41 (1970) (4-st., side-valve, 171cc)
G42 (1972–1979) (4-st., side-valve, 170cc)
G45 (?–1968)
G50 (1970–1978) (4-st., side-valve, 187cc)
GT50 (?–?) (4-st., side-valve, 187cc) (kerosene type)
G65 (?–1979) (4-st., side-valve, 240cc)
GS65 (1976–1977)
G80 (1979) (4-st., side-valve, 296cc)
G series (1-cylinder, air-cooled, side-valve)
Horizontal shaft
G100 (1981–2002) (97cc)
G150 (1978–2003) (144cc)
G200 (1978–2003) (197cc)
G300 (1978–?) (272cc)
G400 (1978–?) (406cc)
Vertical shaft
GV100 (1990–2003) (76cc on K0 version, then 97cc on K1 and K2))
GV150 (1979–1991) (144cc)
GV200 (1979–1991) (197cc)
GV400 (1979–1986) (406cc)
GX series (1-cylinder, OHV)
Horizontal shaft
GX110 (1983–?) (107cc)
GX140 (1983–?) (144cc)
Vertical shaft
GXV110 (?–?) (110cc)
GXV120 (1984–?) (118cc)
GXV140 (1991–2001) (135,1cc)
GXV270 (1986–2003) (270cc)
GC series (1-cylinder, OHC)
Horizontal shaft
GC135 (1997–?) (135cc)
Vertical shaft
GCV135 (1997–?) (135cc)
Mini 4-stroke series (OHV)
GX22 (1997–2002) (22,2cc)
GX31 (1997–2005) (31cc)
GX series (2-cylinder in line, water-cooled, OHC)
Horizontal shaft
GX360 (1989–) (359cc)
GX640 (1994–?) (635cc)
GX series (2-cylinder V-twin, air-cooled, OHV)
Horizontal shaft
GX610 (1994–2009) (614cc)
GX620 (1993–2009) (614cc)
GX670 (2001–2009) (670cc)
Vertical shaft
GXV610 (1995–2009) (614cc)
GXV620 (1995–2009) (614cc)
GXV670 (2001–2009) (670cc)
GD series (Diesel)
Horizontal shaft
GD320 (1990–1995) (1-cylinder, air-cooled, OHV) (317cc)
GD321 (1994–2002) (1-cylinder, air-cooled, OHV) (317cc)
GD410 (1989–1995) (1-cylinder, air-cooled, OHV) (411cc)
GD411 (1994–2005) (1-cylinder, air-cooled, OHV) (411cc)
GD1100 (1990–?) (3-cylinder in line, water-cooled, OHC) (1061cc)
GD1250 (1990–?) (3-cylinder in line, water-cooled, OHC) (1061cc)

Marine engines (current range)
1-cylinder (OHV)
BF2.3, BF5
2-cylinder (OHC)
BF8, bf8 BF10, BF15, BF20
3-cylinder (OHC)
BF25, BF30 (552cc, 6-valve)
BF40, BF50 (808cc, 6-valve)
BF60 (998cc, 12-valve)
4-cylinder (in-line, 1496cc, SOHC, based on L15 automotive engine)
BF75, BF90 (VTEC)
4-cylinder (in-line, 2354cc, DOHC, based on K24 automotive engine)
BF115 (new), BF135, BF150 (VTEC)
6-cylinder (V6, 3471cc, SOHC, based on J35 automotive engine)
BF175, BF200, BF225 (VTEC)

Aircraft 
 GE Honda HF120 (with General Electric)

See also
 Earth Dreams Technology

References

External links
 www.honda.com
 world.honda.com
 www.honda-engines-eu.com
 engines.honda.com

Honda engines
Honda